Broad Street Station (originally Union Station)  was a union railroad station in Richmond, Virginia, United States, across Broad Street from the Fan district. The building is now used by the Science Museum of Virginia.

History

It was built as the southern terminus for the Richmond, Fredericksburg and Potomac Railroad (RF&P) in 1917 in the neoclassical style by the architect John Russell Pope. The station also served the trains of the Atlantic Coast Line Railroad (ACL) and Norfolk and Western Railway (N&W). Eventually, the Seaboard Air Line Railroad (SAL), which had formerly used Richmond's other union station, Main Street Station, switched to Broad Street Station.

At Amtrak's inception in 1971, it was served by the Champion, Silver Meteor, and Silver Star (all inherited from the Seaboard Coast Line Railroad, successor to ACL and SAL),  and the Southern Railway's Asheville Special. It was added to the National Register of Historic Places on February 23, 1972.

Passenger service to the station ceased in 1975, when Amtrak consolidated all Richmond-area service at a suburban station on Staples Mill Road, north of downtown.  By 1976, Broad Street Station became the new home of the Science Museum of Virginia, which remains in the substantially remodeled and expanded building.

See also
History of Richmond, Virginia
Transportation in Richmond, Virginia

References

Former Atlantic Coast Line Railroad stations
History of Richmond, Virginia
John Russell Pope buildings
National Register of Historic Places in Richmond, Virginia
Neoclassical architecture in Virginia
Railway stations closed in 1975
Railway stations on the National Register of Historic Places in Virginia
Railway stations in the United States opened in 1917
Former Seaboard Air Line Railroad stations
Former Norfolk and Western Railway stations
Richmond Broad Street
Transportation in Richmond, Virginia
Union stations in the United States
1917 establishments in Virginia
1975 disestablishments in Virginia